AOCC may refer to:

 American Orthodox Catholic Church
 AMD Optimizing C/C++ Compiler
 American Overseas Clinics Corporation, run by John A. Shaw